Ilse Klink (born 4 March 1972), is a South African actress and singer. She is best known for his roles in the popular television serials Isidingo and Inkaba and Arendsvlei.

Personal life
She was born on 4 March 1972, in Cape Town, South Africa. She completed her BA Drama at Pretoria University. She is the first black person to graduate from the University of Pretoria's drama school.

Career
She first started her acting career at the Performing Arts Council of the Orange Free State. In 1999, she was selected for the role 'Vanessa Booysens' in the television soap opera Isidingo. With the role became highly popular, she continued to play the character until 2007 where she later won an Avanti Award for Best Actress in a Soapie in 2000. In 2012, she played the role of Fashion Week CEO 'Miranda Simons' in the Mzansi Magic telenovela Inkaba.

Meanwhile, she also performed in several theater productions such as Fiddler on the Roof, Maru, The Fantasticks, Blomtyd is Bloeityd, Slegs vir Almal, Amen Corner, Chicago, Rent and Menopause the Musical. She made several elderly supportive roles in the television serials Tussen Duiwels, Molo Fish, Hagenheim Streng Privaat and Snitch 2.

Apart from acting, she is a singer, who is the lead singer for an Afrikaans alternative rock band 'Ekstra Dik'. In cinema, she acted in the films Ellen: The Ellen Pakkies Story, Cold Harbour, Dis ek, Anna and Stroomop. For her role in the film Stroomop, she was later awarded the Golden Horn for Best Supporting Actress at 2019 South African Film and Television Awards (SAFTA).

In 2015, she played a lead role as 'Tamara van Niekerk', a dance teacher in the television series Roer Jou Voete. Then in 2017, she was invited to play the role 'Adeole' on three seasons of the Mzansi Magic prison drama Lockdown. In 2020, she starred in the serial Arendsvlei for its third season where she played the role 'Dortothy Galant'.

Television serials
 7de Laan as Natasha Kleinhans
 Arendsvlei as Dorothy Galant
 Broken Vows as Suzanne
 Diamond City as Abida
 Fynskrif as Evelyn
 iNkaba as Miranda Simons
 Isidingo as Vanessa Booysens
 Lockdown as Adeole
 Roer Jou Voete as Tamara van Niekerk
 Snitch as Dr Conchis
 Sorted as Ilse Klink

References

External links
 

Living people
People from Mpumalanga
South African television actresses
South African film actresses
1972 births
South African musicians